William Gosset may refer to:
 William Sealy Gosset, English statistician, chemist and brewer
 William Gosset (politician), British Army officer and member of parliament 
 William Driscoll Gosset, British Army officer, engineer and surveyor